Hrіm-2, Grim, Grom or OTRK Sapsan, also known as Operational-Tactical Missile System Hrim, is a Ukrainian short-range ballistic missile system being developed by Pivdenne Design Office and A.M. Makarov Southern Machine-Building Plant, designed to combine the features of a tactical missile system and a multiple rocket launcher. The original Sapsan version of the missile, for Ukraine's own use, was to have a range of 500 kilometers. The later Hrim-2 version, developed for export, has a range limited to 280 kilometers, in order to fall within the 300-kilometre limit set by the Missile Technology Control Regime, which seeks to limit the proliferation of missiles and missile technology.

History
In 2006 the National Security and Defense Council of Ukraine recognised the need for a missile system that would be better than Ukraine's aging Soviet Tochka-U, which had a maximum range of 120 km and could only be overhauled and upgraded by Russian companies. KB Pivdenne was given the task of developing a new missile designated the "Sapsan". The Ministry of Defence and Pivdenne agreed on operational requirements in September 2007. Funding for the project was halted in 2009–2010, following the global financial crisis of 2007–2008, then resumed in November 2011, albeit at a low amount, before being terminated in 2013.

In 2011 arms dealers started offering foreign customers a new missile system called "Hrim", and after two years, Pivdenne was contracted by an undisclosed country to develop the Hrim-2. In 2014, after the Russo-Ukrainian War had begun, Pivdenne proposed restarting the Sapsan project, utilising its experience developing the Hrim-2, with a view to having Sapsan ready for evaluation by 2018. The government agreed. 

Work on Hrim-2 was announced at the  exhibition in Kyiv in 2014. In 2016 it was reported that Saudi Arabia had provided US$40 million for the research and development. A photograph of the chassis of a Hrim-2 transporter erector launcher appeared in May 2017; each vehicle could carry and launch two missiles. In April 2019 it was announced that two Hrim-2 prototypes had been produced, one for testing by Saudi Arabia and the other to be tested by the Armed Forces of Ukraine. Saudi Arabia was expected to test their test article one later in 2019, with the system planned to enter service in 2022.  In October 2020, it was announced that US$300 million would be needed to complete the testing of Ukraine's prototype. In February 2021 the government decided to sign a contract to fund the production of a test battery consisting of two transporter erector launchers, two loading machines, and two control units (one for the battery commander and the other for the division commander). The contract had not yet been signed by April of 2021, but the Ministry of Defense hoped to do so in 2–3 months.

Explosions at Saky airbase, Novofedorivka
Several large explosions occurred at Saky airbase at Novofedorivka in Russian-occupied Crimea, 220 km from the frontline, on 9 August 2022. The cause was unclear, but several media outlets discussed the possibility it was Hrim-2.

Gallery

See also
 R-360 Neptune, Ukrainian
 Vilkha, Ukrainian
 9K720 Iskander, Russian
 LORA (missile), Israeli
 Sky Spear, Taiwanese

References

Ballistic missiles of Ukraine
Surface-to-surface missiles
Theatre ballistic missiles